Margarita Nikolaevna is a fictional character from the novel The Master and Margarita by the Russian writer Mikhail Bulgakov.

Description 
In the novel, Margarita Nikolaevna is 30 years old. She is a pretty Muscovite, strong and resolute. She is a housewife, residing in downtown Moscow and married to a rich, famous military engineer she doesn't love and with whom she has no children. She lives in a large apartment and has a servant (Natasha, who later becomes a witch). She falls in love with a writer who she called Master (an honorary rather than domination nickname), who is kidnapped one night without her knowledge, leaving her confused and melancholy. She is invited to join Woland's entourage, performing the role of Queen by hosting Satan's Ball at Woland's request.

Most Bulgakov scholars believe that the main prototype for Margarita was Elena Bulgakova, the third and last wife of the writer, whom he called "my Margarita". The love between the two main characters is described in the novel as follows: "Love  leaped out in front of us like  a  murderer  in an  alley leaping out of nowhere, and struck us both at once. As lightning strikes, as a Finnish knife strikes! She, by the way, insisted afterwards that it wasn't so, that we had, of course, loved each other for a long, long  time, without knowing  each  other...".

References 

Characters in Russian novels of the 20th century
Mikhail Bulgakov characters
Female characters in literature
Literary characters introduced in 1966
Comedy literature characters